Jackie Turner (born 1959) is a retired English boxer.

Boxing career
Turner was twice National Champion in 1977 and 1978 after winning the prestigious ABA flyweight title, boxing out of Hull Fish Trades ABC.

He represented England in the -54 kg bantamweight division, at the 1978 Commonwealth Games in Edmonton, Alberta, Canada.

He turned professional on 25 January 1980 and fought in 18 fights.

References

Living people
1959 births
British male boxers
Boxers at the 1978 Commonwealth Games
Bantamweight boxers
Flyweight boxers
Commonwealth Games competitors for England